The Grand Théâtre de Bordeaux is an opera house in Bordeaux, France, first inaugurated on 17 April 1780. It was in this theatre that the ballet La fille mal gardée premiered in 1789, and where a young Marius Petipa staged some of his first ballets.

The theatre was designed by the architect Victor Louis (1731–1800). Louis later designed the galleries surrounding, the gardens of the Palais Royal, and the Théâtre Français in Paris.

The Grand Theatre of Bordeaux was conceived as a temple of the Arts and Light, with a neo-classical facade.
It has a portico of 12 Corinthian style colossal columns which support an entablature on which stand 12 statues that represent the nine Muses and three goddesses (Juno, Venus and Minerva). 
Pierre-François Berruer made four of the statues, and his assistant Van den Drix carved the others from Berruer's models.

The interior grand staircase served as a model for the grand staircase of the Opéra Garnier in Paris.

On the ceiling of the auditorium, there is a large fresco painted by Jean-Baptiste-Claude Robin. It pays homage to the Arts, to the artisans that built the building, and to the city of Bordeaux. The late scene shows a woman, allegory of Bordeaux, protected by Hermes and Athena, and in the foreground, three wealth of the city : the wine, the sea trade and the slave.

In 1871, the theatre was briefly the National Assembly for the French Parliament.

The inside of the theatre was restored in 1991, and once again has its original colours of blue and gold. The Grand Théâtre de Bordeaux is one of the oldest wooden frame opera houses in Europe not to have burnt or required rebuilding.

Today, the theatre is home to the Opéra National de Bordeaux, as well as the Ballet National de Bordeaux which has many international dancers.

Gallery

Bibliography

Notes

External links 

Opéra National de Bordeaux
Ballet National de Bordeaux

Theatres in France
Opera houses in France
Neoclassical architecture in France
Buildings and structures in Bordeaux
Music venues completed in 1780
Tourist attractions in Bordeaux
Theatres completed in 1780
1780 establishments in France
18th-century architecture in France